National Secondary Route 120, or just Route 120 (or ) is a National Road Route of Costa Rica, located in the Alajuela, Heredia provinces.

Description
In Alajuela province the route covers Alajuela canton (Sabanilla district), Grecia canton (San Isidro district), Poás canton (San Juan, Sabana Redonda districts).

In Heredia province the route covers Heredia canton (Varablanca district).

References

Highways in Costa Rica